Krieg (German: "war") may refer to:


Arts and entertainment

Fictional characters 
 Krieg (character), a fictional character from the Borderlands video game series
Don Krieg, a character from the One Piece manga series
Death Korps of Krieg, an Imperial Guard regiment in the Warhammer 40,000 fictional universe

Music
 Krieg (album), an album by KMFDM
 Krieg (band), an American black metal band
 "Krieg" (song), a song by Farin Urlaub Racing Team

People with the surname Krieg 
Bill Krieg (1859–1930), American professional baseball player
Christine Krieg, Swiss female curler, European champion
Dave Krieg (b. 1958), American professional football player
Lothar Krieg (b. 1955), German Olympic track and field athlete
Nathalie Krieg (b.1977), Swiss figure skater
Peter Krieg (b. 1947), German documentary film maker
Susan Krieg (b. 1952), American painter and muralist